Dirk Bellemans (born 22 February 1966) is a Belgian former sailor. He competed in the men's 470 event at the 1992 Summer Olympics.

References

External links
 

1966 births
Living people
Belgian male sailors (sport)
Olympic sailors of Belgium
Sailors at the 1992 Summer Olympics – 470
People from Vilvoorde
Sportspeople from Flemish Brabant